Stephen Guthrie is a wheelchair rugby player from New Zealand, and a member of the national team, the Wheel Blacks.

Stephen was part of the wheel blacks at three consecutive Paralympics.  His first appearance was in 1996 when wheelchair rugby was a demonstration event and the New Zealand team finished in fourth place, four years later in 2000 he was part of the team that went one better and won the bronze medal.  His final appearance was in the 2004 Summer Paralympics where the wheel blacks displace the American team to win the gold medal.

References

External links 
 
 

Paralympic wheelchair rugby players of New Zealand
Wheelchair rugby players at the 1996 Summer Paralympics
Wheelchair rugby players at the 2000 Summer Paralympics
Wheelchair rugby players at the 2004 Summer Paralympics
Paralympic gold medalists for New Zealand
Paralympic bronze medalists for New Zealand
Living people
Medalists at the 1996 Summer Paralympics
Medalists at the 2000 Summer Paralympics
Medalists at the 2004 Summer Paralympics
Year of birth missing (living people)
Paralympic medalists in wheelchair rugby
21st-century New Zealand people